Marko Antila (born 1969) is a Finnish film producer and director.

Antila studied in Tampere at the Art and Film School. Antila has directed dozens of music videos, and he moved into commercial business in 1998. Antila has won several national and international awards such as Cresta, Epica and Fab.

In 2004, Antila directed the TV series "Pelastakaa sotamies Hytönen". This reality show followed TV personality Joonas Hytönen during his mandatory military service in the Finnish armed forces.

Marko Antila founded production company Mjölk together with Yrjö Nieminen. Antila produced the movie "8-pallo" (directed by Aku Louhimies). The movie premiered 22 February 2013.

During spring 2015, Antila co-founded the storytelling company Lucy Loves Stories, where he now works as a producer.

References

1969 births
Finnish film directors
Living people